Fight Lah! Kopitiam is a 2020 Malaysian Cantonese-language comedy film. It tells the story of a kopitiam family, who has to fight and win in a boxing match, in order to keep their shop and bring glory back to the business.

The film is released on 30 January 2020 in Malaysia. It is one of the four 2020 Malaysian Chinese New Year films, including A Moment of Happiness, The God of Wealth, and Good Wealth 2020.

Synopsis

Cast 
Jack Lim
Cedric Loo
Wan Wai Fun
Uncle Frankie
Steve Yap
Jaspers Lai
Chang Yong
Han Xiiao Aii
Shir Chong
Kenny Gan
Chew Kuan Mei
Mike Chua

Reception

Box office 
Despite the impact of the COVID-19 pandemic on cinema during January 2020, the movie still able to earn RM2 million in Malaysia alone in the first 10 days since the premiere.

References

External links 
 

Malaysian sports comedy films
2020 comedy films
2020s sports comedy films
Boxing films